Yallappa Nayakana Hosakote, often written as Y. N. Hosakote is a small town in the southern state of Karnataka, India. It is located in the Pavagada taluk of Tumkur district in Karnataka. In 1556 a local king named Yallappa Nayaka founded the fort on the hill Siddarabetta beside Kundurpi, named Yallappanayakana hosakote.

Demographics
As of the 2011 India census, Y. N. Hosakote had a population of 12593 with 6423 males and 6170 females.

The nearest town is Pavagada,  from Y.N.Hosakote. The village has its own panchayat, police station, and post office. Its pin code is 572141.

Economy
This town's main business is agriculture and also silk saree (handlooms). Many people are self employed with hand-looms. Designing for the silk sarees and coloring the silk is the main business here.

During the rainy season, the main craft is ground nut which is grown on the dry land.

See also
 Tumkur
 Districts of Karnataka

References

    Gadinada Yallappa Nayakana Hosakote -Ho.Ma.Nagaraj - 2010

External links

http://Tumkur.nic.in/

Cities and towns in Tumkur district